Mathabhanga Assembly constituency is an assembly constituency in Cooch Behar district in the Indian state of West Bengal. It is reserved for scheduled castes.

Overview
As per orders of the Delimitation Commission, No. 2 Mathabhanga Assembly constituency (SC)  covers Mathabhanga municipality, Mathabhanga II community development block, and Hazrahat I, Hazrahat II and Pachagarh gram panchayats of Mathabhanga I community development block.

Mathabhanga Assembly constituency is part of No. 1. Cooch Behar (Lok Sabha constituency) (SC).

Members of Legislative Assembly

Election results

2021

2016

2011
In the 2011 election, Binay Krishna Barman of Trinamool Congress defeated his nearest rival Ananta Roy of CPI(M).

.# Trinamool Congress did not contest the seat in 2006.

1977–2006
In the 2006 state assembly elections, Ananta Roy of the Communist Party of India (Marxist) won the Mathabhanga seat defeating Hem Chandra Barman of the Bharatiya Janata Party (BJP). Contests in most years were multi cornered but only winners and runners are being mentioned. Dinesh Chandra Dakua of CPI(M) won the seat six times in a row from 1977 to 2001, and also in 1967. He defeated Binoy Krishna Barman of the Trinamool Congress in 2001, Jatindranath Barman of the Indian National Congress in 1996, Prasenjit Barman of Congress in 1991, Jatindranath Barman of Congress in 1987, Hitendra Nath Pramanik of Congress on 1982 and Pratap Singha in 1977.

1951-1972
Birendranath Roy of Congress won in 1972, 1971 and 1969. Dinesh Chandra Dakua of CPI(M) won in 1967. Mahendra Nath Dakua of Congress won in 1962. Sarada Prasad Pramanick of Congress won in 1957 and in independent India's first election in 1951.

References

Assembly constituencies of West Bengal
Politics of Cooch Behar district